The 2018–19 New York Rangers season was the franchise's 92nd season of play and their 93rd season overall. The Rangers were eliminated from playoff contention on March 23, 2019.

Standings

Divisional standings

Conference standings

Schedule and results

Pre-season
The pre-season schedule was published on June 19, 2018.

|- style="background:#cfc;"
| 1 || September 17 || @ New Jersey Devils || 4–3  || 1–0–0
|- style="background:#fcc;"
| 2 || September 19 || Philadelphia Flyers || 4–6 || 1–1–0
|- style="background:#fcc;"
| 3 || September 22 || @ New York Islanders || 2–5 || 1–2–0
|- style="background:#cfc;"
| 4 || September 24 || New Jersey Devils || 4–3  || 2–2–0
|- style="background:#fff;"
| 5 || September 26 || New York Islanders || 3–4  || 2–2–1
|- style="background:#cfc;"
| 6 || September 27 || @ Philadelphia Flyers || 4–2 || 3–2–1
|-

Regular season
The regular season schedule was released on June 21, 2018.

|- style="background:#fcc;"
| 1 || October 4 || Nashville || 2–3 || || Lundqvist || Madison Square Garden || 17,117 || 0–1–0 || 0 || Recap
|- style="background:#fcc;"
| 2 || October 6 || @ Buffalo || 1–3 || || Lundqvist || KeyBank Center || 16,824 || 0–2–0 || 0 || Recap
|- style="background:#fcc;"
| 3 || October 7 || @ Carolina || 5–8 ||  || Georgiev || PNC Arena || 13,526 || 0–3–0 || 0 || Recap
|- style="background:#cfc;"
| 4 || October 11 || San Jose || 3–2 || OT || Lundqvist || Madison Square Garden || 17,004 || 1–3–0 || 2 || Recap
|- style="background:#fcc;"
| 5 || October 13 || Edmonton || 1–2 ||  ||  Lundqvist|| Madison Square Garden || 17,085 || 1–4–0 || 2 || Recap
|- style="background:#cfc;"
| 6 || October 16 || Colorado || 3–2 || SO || Lundqvist || Madison Square Garden || 17,251 || 2–4–0 || 4 || Recap
|- style="background:#fff;"
| 7 || October 17 || @ Washington || 3–4 || OT || Lundqvist || Capital One Arena || 18,506 || 2–4–1 || 5 || Recap
|- style="background:#fcc;"
| 8 || October 21 || Calgary || 1–4 ||  || Lundqvist || Madison Square Garden || 17,404 || 2–5–1 || 5 || Recap
|- style="background:#cfc;"
| 9 || October 23 || Florida || 5–2 ||  || Georgiev || Madison Square Garden || 17,016 || 3–5–1 || 7 || Recap
|- style="background:#fcc;"
| 10 || October 25 || @ Chicago || 1–4 ||  || Lundqvist || United Center || 21,280 || 3–6–1 || 7 || Recap
|- style="background:#fcc;"
| 11 || October 28 || @ Los Angeles || 3–4 ||  || Lundqvist || Staples Center || 18,230 || 3–7–1 || 7 || Recap
|- style="background:#cfc;"
| 12 || October 30 || @ San Jose || 4–3 || SO || Lundqvist || SAP Center || 17,562 || 4–7–1 || 9 || Recap
|-

|- style="background:#cfc;"
| 13 || November 1 || @ Anaheim || 3–2 || SO || Georgiev || Honda Center || 16,101 || 5–7–1 || 11 || Recap
|- style="background:#cfc;"
| 14 || November 4 || Buffalo || 3–1 ||  || Lundqvist  || Madison Square Garden || 16,904 || 6–7–1 || 13 || Recap
|- style="background:#cfc;"
| 15 || November 6 || Montreal || 5–3 ||  || Lundqvist || Madison Square Garden || 17,428 || 7–7–1 || 15 || Recap
|- style="background:#fff;"
| 16 || November 9 || @ Detroit || 2–3 || OT || Lundqvist || Little Caesars Arena || 19,515 || 7–7–2 || 16 || Recap
|- style="background:#cfc;"
| 17 || November 10 || @ Columbus || 5–4 || SO || Georgiev || Nationwide Arena || 18,384 || 8–7–2 || 18 || Recap
|- style="background:#cfc;"
| 18 || November 12 || Vancouver || 2–1 ||  || Lundqvist || Madison Square Garden || 17,100 || 9–7–2 || 20 || Recap
|- style="background:#fcc;"
| 19 || November 15 || @ NY Islanders || 5–7 ||  || Georgiev || Barclays Center || 13,472 || 9–8–2 || 20 || Recap
|- style="background:#cfc;"
| 20 || November 17 || Florida || 4–2 ||  || Lundqvist || Madison Square Garden || 18,006 || 10–8–2 || 22 || Recap
|- style="background:#cfc;"
| 21 || November 19 || Dallas || 2–1 ||  || Lundqvist || Madison Square Garden || 17,071 || 11–8–2 || 24 || Recap
|- style="background:#cfc;"
| 22 || November 21 || NY Islanders || 5–0 ||  || Georgiev || Madison Square Garden || 17,297 || 12–8–2 || 26 || Recap
|- style="background:#fcc;"
| 23 || November 23 || @ Philadelphia || 0–4 ||  || Lundqvist || Wells Fargo Center || 19,523 || 12–9–2 || 26 || Recap
|- style="background:#fcc;"
| 24 || November 24 || Washington || 3–5 ||  || Georgiev || Madison Square Garden || 16,884 || 12–10–2 || 26 || Recap
|- style="background:#cfc;"
| 25 || November 26 || Ottawa || 4–2 ||  || Lundqvist || Madison Square Garden || 16,709 || 13–10–2 || 28 || Recap
|- style="background:#fcc;"
| 26 || November 29 || @ Ottawa || 0–3 ||  || Lundqvist || Canadian Tire Centre || 10,921 || 13–11–2 || 28 || Recap
|-

|- style="background:#fcc;"
| 27 || December 1 || @ Montreal || 2–5 ||  || Georgiev || Bell Centre || 21,302 || 13–12–2 || 28 || Recap
|- style="background:#fff;"
| 28 || December 2 || Winnipeg || 3–4 || SO || Lundqvist || Madison Square Garden || 17,464 || 13–12–3 || 29 || Recap
|- style="background:#cfc;"
| 29 || December 8 || @ Florida || 5–4 || SO || Lundqvist || BB&T Center || 15,295 || 14–12–3 || 31 || Recap
|- style="background:#fcc;"
| 30 || December 10 || @ Tampa Bay || 3–6 ||  || Lundqvist || Amalie Arena || 19,092 || 14–13–3 || 31 || Recap
|- style="background:#fff;"
| 31 || December 14 || Arizona || 3–4 || OT || Lundqvist || Madison Square Garden || 17,441 || 14–13–4 || 32 || Recap
|- style="background:#fff;"
| 32 || December 16 || Vegas || 3–4 || OT || Lundqvist || Madison Square Garden || 17,660 || 14–13–5 || 33 || Recap
|- style="background:#cfc;"
| 33 || December 18 || Anaheim || 3–1 ||  || Gerogiev || Madison Square Garden || 17,590 || 15–13–5 || 35 || Recap
|- style="background:#fcc;"
| 34 || December 22 || @ Toronto || 3–5 ||  || Georgiev || Scotiabank Arena || 19,466 || 15–14–5 || 35 || Recap
|- style="background:#fff;"
| 35 || December 23 || Philadelphia || 2–3 || SO || Lundqvist || Madison Square Garden || 17,515 || 15–14–6 || 36 || Recap
|- style="background:#fff;"
| 36 || December 27 || Columbus || 3–4 || OT || Lundqvist || Madison Square Garden || 18,006 || 15–14–7 || 37 || Recap
|- style="background:#cfc;"
| 37 || December 29 || @ Nashville || 4–3 ||  || Lundqvist || Bridgestone Arena || 17,673 || 16–14–7 || 39 || Recap
|- style="background:#cfc;"
| 38 || December 31 || @ St. Louis || 2–1 ||  || Lundqvist || Enterprise Center || 16,849 || 17–14–7 || 41 || Recap
|-

|- style="background:#fcc;"
| 39 || January 2 || Pittsburgh || 2–7 ||  || Lundqvist || Madison Square Garden || 18,006 || 17–15–7 || 41 || Recap
|- style="background:#fcc;"
| 40 || January 4 || @ Colorado || 1–6 ||  || Georgiev || Pepsi Center || 17,287 || 17–16–7 || 41 || Recap
|- style="background:#fcc;"
| 41 || January 6 || @ Arizona || 0–5 ||  || Lundqvist || Gila River Arena || 12,396 || 17–17–7 || 41 || Recap
|- style="background:#fcc;"
| 42 || January 8 || @ Vegas || 2–4 ||  || Georgiev || T-Mobile Arena || 18,249 || 17–18–7 || 41 || Recap
|- style="background:#fcc;"
| 43 || January 10 || NY Islanders || 3–4 ||  || Lundqvist || Madison Square Garden || 17,938 || 17–19–7 || 41 || Recap
|- style="background:#cfc;"
| 44 || January 12 || @ NY Islanders || 2–1 ||  || Georgiev || Barclays Center || 15,497 || 18–19–7 || 43 || Recap
|- style="background:#fcc;"
| 45 || January 13 || @ Columbus || 5–7 ||  || Georgiev || Nationwide Arena || 17,417 || 18–20–7 || 43 || Recap
|- style="background:#cfc;"
| 46 || January 15 || Carolina || 6–2 ||  || Lundqvist || Madison Square Garden || 17,636 || 19–20–7 || 45 || Recap
|- style="background:#cfc;"
| 47 || January 17 || Chicago || 4–3 ||  || Lundqvist || Madison Square Garden || 17,434 || 20–20–7 || 47 || Recap
|- style="background:#cfc;"
| 48 || January 19 || @ Boston || 3–2 ||  || Lundqvist || TD Garden || 17,565 || 21–20–7 || 49 || Recap
|- style="background:#fcc;"
| 49 || January 29 || Philadelphia || 0–1 ||  || Georgiev || Madison Square Garden || 17,163 || 21–21–7 || 49 || Recap
|- style="background:#cfc;"
| 50 || January 31 || @ New Jersey || 4–3 ||  || Lundqvist || Prudential Center || 16,514 || 22–21–7 || 51 || Recap
|-

|- style="background:#fcc;"
| 51 || February 2 || Tampa Bay || 2–3 ||  || Lundqvist || Madison Square Garden || 17,468 || 22–22–7 || 51 || Recap
|- style="background:#fff;"
| 52 || February 4 || Los Angeles || 3–4 || OT || Lundqvist || Madison Square Garden || 16,233 || 22–22–8 || 52 || Recap
|- style="background:#cfc;"
| 53 || February 6 || Boston || 4–3 || SO || Georgiev || Madison Square Garden || 16,848 || 23–22–8 || 54 || Recap
|- style="background:#fcc;"
| 54 || February 8 || Carolina || 0–3 ||  || Lundqvist || Madison Square Garden || 18,006 || 23–23–8 || 54 || Recap
|- style="background:#cfc;"
| 55 || February 10  || Toronto || 4–1 ||  || Georgiev || Madison Square Garden || 17,445 || 24–23–8 || 56 || Recap
|- style="background:#fcc;"
| 56 || February 12 || @ Winnipeg || 3–4 ||  || Lundqvist || Bell MTS Place || 15,321 || 24–24–8 || 56 || Recap
|- style="background:#cfc;"
| 57 || February 15 || @ Buffalo || 6–2 ||  || Georgiev || KeyBank Center || 19,070 || 25–24–8 || 58 || Recap
|- style="background:#fcc;"
| 58 || February 17 || @ Pittsburgh || 5–6 ||  || Georgiev || PPG Paints Arena || 18,646 || 25–25–8 || 58 || Recap
|- style="background:#cfc;"
| 59 || February 19 || @ Carolina || 2–1 ||  || Lundqvist || PNC Arena || 13,343 || 26–25–8 || 60 || Recap
|- style="background:#fcc;"
| 60 || February 21 || Minnesota || 4–1 ||  || Lundqvist || Madison Square Garden || 17,271 || 26–26–8 || 60 || Recap
|- style="background:#cfc;"
| 61 || February 23 || New Jersey || 5–2 ||  || Georgiev || Madison Square Garden || 17,371 || 27–26–8 || 62 || Recap
|- style="background:#fff;"
| 62 || February 24 || @ Washington || 5–6 || OT || Lundqvist || Capital One Arena || 18,506 || 27–26–9 || 63 || Recap
|- style="background:#fff;"
| 63 || February 27 || Tampa Bay || 3–4 || OT || Georgiev || Madison Square Garden || 17,012 || 27–26–10 || 64 || Recap
|-

|- style="background:#fcc;"
| 64 || March 1 || Montreal || 2–4 ||  || Lundqvist || Madison Square Garden || 17,334 || 27–27–10 || 64 || Recap
|- style="background:#fff;"
| 65 || March 3 || Washington || 2–3 || SO || Georgiev || Madison Square Garden || 17,517 || 27–27–11 || 65 || Recap
|- style="background:#fcc;"
| 66 || March 5 || @ Dallas || 0–1 ||  || Georgiev || American Airlines Center || 17,974 || 27–28–11 || 65 || Recap
|- style="background:#fff;"
| 67 || March 7 || @ Detroit || 2–3 || SO || Lundqvist || Little Caesars Arena  || 18,333 || 27–28–12 || 66 || Recap
|- style="background:#cfc;"
| 68 || March 9 || New Jersey || 4–2 ||  || Lundqvist || Madison Square Garden || 17,386 || 28–28–12 || 68 || Recap
|- style="background:#fff;"
| 69 || March 11 || @ Edmonton || 2–3 || OT || Georgiev || Rogers Place || 18,347 || 28–28–13 || 69 || Recap
|- style="background:#fcc;"
| 70 || March 13 || @ Vancouver || 1–4 ||  || Lundqvist || Rogers Arena || 18,225 || 28–29–13 || 69 || Recap
|- style="background:#fcc;"
| 71 || March 15 || @ Calgary || 1–5 ||  || Georgiev || Scotiabank Saddledome || 18,956 || 28–30–13 || 69 || Recap
|- style="background:#fcc;"
| 72 || March 16 || @ Minnesota || 2–5 ||  || Lundqvist || Xcel Energy Center || 18,844 || 28–31–13 || 69 || Recap
|- style="background:#fcc;"
| 73 || March 19 || Detroit || 2–3 ||  || Lundqvist || Madison Square Garden || 17,183 || 28–32–13 || 69 || Recap
|- style="background:#cfc;"
| 74 || March 23 || @ Toronto || 2–1 || OT || Georgiev || Scotiabank Arena || 19,251 || 29–32–13 || 71 || Recap
|- style="background:#fcc;"
| 75 || March 25 || Pittsburgh || 2–5 ||  || Georgiev || Madison Square Garden || 17,401 || 29–33–13 || 71 || Recap
|- style="background:#fcc;"
| 76 || March 27 || @ Boston || 3–6 ||  || Lundqvist || TD Garden || 17,565 || 29–34–13 || 71 || Recap
|- style="background:#cfc;"
| 77 || March 29 || St. Louis || 4–2 ||  || Georgiev || Madison Square Garden || 17,567 || 30–34–13 || 73 || Recap
|- style="background:#cfc;"
| 78 || March 31 || @ Philadelphia || 3–0 ||  || Georgiev || Wells Fargo Center || 19,437 || 31–34–13 || 75 || Recap
|-

|- style="background:#fcc;"
| 79 || April 1 || @ New Jersey || 2–4 ||  || Lundqvist || Prudential Center || 14,776 || 31–35–13 || 75 || Recap
|- style="background:#fcc;"
| 80 || April 3 || Ottawa || 1–4 ||  || Lundqvist || Madison Square Garden || 16,562 || 31–36–13 || 75 || Recap
|- style="background:#fff;"
| 81 || April 5 || Columbus || 2–3 || SO || Georgiev || Madison Square Garden || 17,341 || 31–36–14 || 76 || Recap
|- style="background:#cfc;"
| 82 || April 6 || @ Pittsburgh || 4–3 || OT || Georgiev || PPG Paints Arena || 18,660 || 32–36–14 || 78 || Recap
|-

|-
|

Player statistics
As of April 6, 2019

Skaters

Goaltenders

Awards and honors

Milestones

Records

Transactions
The Rangers have been involved in the following transactions during the 2018–19 season.

Trades

Free agents

Contract terminations

Retirement

Signings

Draft picks

Below are the New York Rangers' selections at the 2018 NHL Entry Draft, which was held on June 22 and 23, 2018, at the American Airlines Center in Dallas, Texas.

Notes:
 The Pittsburgh Penguins' first-round pick went to the New York Rangers as the result of a trade on June 22, 2018, that sent Boston's first-round pick and New Jersey's second-round pick (22nd and 48th overall) both in 2018 to Ottawa in exchange for this pick.
 The Tampa Bay Lightning's first-round pick went to the New York Rangers as the result of a trade on February 26, 2018, that sent Ryan McDonagh and J.T. Miller to Tampa Bay in exchange for Vladislav Namestnikov, Libor Hajek, Brett Howden, a conditional first-round pick in 2019 and this pick.
 The Boston Bruins' third-round pick went to the New York Rangers as the result of a trade on February 20, 2018, that sent Nick Holden to Boston in exchange for Rob O'Gara and this pick.
 The Vegas Golden Knights' seventh-round pick went to the New York Rangers as the result of a trade on June 23, 2018, that sent Boston's seventh-round pick in 2019 to Carolina in exchange for this pick.

References

New York Rangers seasons
New York Rangers
New York Rangers
New York Rangers
New York Rangers
 in Manhattan
Madison Square Garden